Olga Grushko (born 7 April 1976) is a retired Kazakhstani volleyball player. She competed in the women's tournament at the 2008 Summer Olympics and played for the Marmaris club in Turkey.

References

1976 births
Living people
Kazakhstani women's volleyball players
Olympic volleyball players of Kazakhstan
Volleyball players at the 2008 Summer Olympics
Volleyball players at the 2002 Asian Games
Volleyball players at the 2006 Asian Games
Kazakhstani expatriate sportspeople in Turkey
Asian Games competitors for Kazakhstan
21st-century Kazakhstani women